Peng Jianfeng (born 6 September 1994) is a Chinese diver.

He won the gold medal in the 1 metre springboard event in the 2017 World Aquatics Championships. Peng also participated at the 2019 World Aquatics Championships, winning a bronze medal.

References

1994 births
Living people
Chinese male divers
World Aquatics Championships medalists in diving
Asian Games medalists in diving
Divers at the 2018 Asian Games
Asian Games gold medalists for China
Medalists at the 2018 Asian Games
Universiade medalists in diving
Universiade gold medalists for China
Medalists at the 2015 Summer Universiade
21st-century Chinese people